Arawá ( Aruá) is an extinct language of Brazil. The people were wiped out by introduced measles, and the last speaker died in 1877.  All that survives is a word list from 1869.

References

Languages of Brazil
Extinct languages of South America
Languages extinct in the 1870s